The Sun Belt Conference women's basketball tournament has been played every year since the 1982-83 academic year. The winner of the tournament is guaranteed an automatic berth into the NCAA Division I women's basketball tournament.

In 2007, the Sun Belt received an at-large berth, as Louisiana–Lafayette (regular season champ of the West Division) received an invite to the national tournament despite losing in the conference tournament final. The following year, the Sun Belt received an at-large berth again, as Middle Tennessee State received an invite to the national tournament. In 2010, it happened again, as Little Rock received an at-large bid, having entered the conference tourney as a #1 seed, before losing to Middle Tennessee in double overtime.

The current tournament format, featuring all conference members, has been in place since the 2020–21 season. The tournament is being held in Pensacola, Florida through at least the 2024–25 season. First- and second-round games are played simultaneously at Hartsell Arena on the campus of Pensacola State College and the Pensacola Bay Center, with semifinals and finals at the Bay Center.

Basketball champions by year

Performance by school

 Current conference members as of the 2022–23 season are indicated in bold.

See also
 Sun Belt Conference men's basketball tournament

References